"Giving Up the Ghost" is an episode of the television series Ugly Betty.

Giving Up the Ghost may also refer to:

Music

Albums
 Giving Up the Ghost, by Gene Loves Jezebel, 2001
 Giving Up the Ghost, by Jackie Greene, 2008
 Giving Up the Ghost, by SubtractiveLAD, 2005
 Giving Up the Ghost, by Robert Walter, 2003
 Giving Up the Ghost, by Windsor for the Derby, 2005
 Giving Up the Ghost, an EP by Alex Vargas, 2015

Songs
 "Giving Up the Ghost", by a-ha from Cast in Steel, 2015
 "Giving Up the Ghost", by the Bee Gees from E.S.P., 1987
 "Giving Up the Ghost", by Birds of Prey from The Hellpreacher, 2009
 "Giving Up the Ghost", by Blossoms from Cool Like You, 2018
 "Giving Up the Ghost", by BT from Movement in Still Life, 1999
 "Giving Up the Ghost", by Marc Cohn from Join the Parade, 2007
 "Giving Up the Ghost", by GZR from Plastic Planet, 1995
 "Giving Up the Ghost", by Kerli from Shadow Works, 2019
 "Giving Up the Ghost", by DJ Shadow from The Private Press, 2002
 "Giving Up the Ghost", by T'Pau from Red, 1998
 "Giving Up the Ghost (That's Haunting Me)", by Lee Greenwood from Holdin' a Good Hand, 1990

Other media
 Giving Up the Ghost, a 2003 memoir by Hilary Mantel
 Giving Up the Ghost, a 1986 play by Cherríe Moraga
 Giving Up the Ghost, a 2008 radio play by Lynne Truss
 Giving Up the Ghost, a 1998 television film directed by Claudia Weill
 "Giving Up the Ghost", an episode of Ghost Whisperer

See also
Give Up the Ghost (disambiguation)